Leandro Ribela (born March 22, 1980) is a Brazilian cross-country skier who has competed since 2007. He finished 90th in the 15 km event at the 2010 Winter Olympics in Vancouver, British Columbia, Canada.

At the FIS Nordic World Ski Championships 2009 in Liberec, Ribela finished 117th in the individual sprint while getting lapped in the 30 km mixed pursuit event.

His best career finish was 13th in a 30 km FIS race in Macedonia in January 2010.

References 

1980 births
Brazilian male cross-country skiers
Cross-country skiers at the 2010 Winter Olympics
Cross-country skiers at the 2014 Winter Olympics
Living people
Olympic cross-country skiers of Brazil
Sportspeople from São Paulo
21st-century Brazilian people